is a band started by Rick Wilder (formerly the singer of the Berlin Brats). Following the breakup of the glam rock / proto - punk band the Berlin Brats in 1976, two years of inactivity followed before Rick Wilder updated his image and sound to more align in the wake of the Los Angeles original punk scene (that had just begun to get off the ground in 1977) and formed the Mau-Mau's in 1978.

The original line-up from Hollywood, California was Greg Salva on guitar, Roderick Donahue on bass, and Rick Torres on drums. They started out playing at The Masque in Hollywood. Salva was replaced by Mike R. Livingston in 1979 after Salva moved to New York City and Donahue was replaced first by Oscar Harvey and then by Scott Franklin (onetime bassist in The Cramps). Wilder had been chosen to be MC of the Penelope Spheeris movie The Decline of Western Civilization but was dumped after he insisted he be able to say what he really thought of every act before their clip (it was probably not going to be too complimentary).

One of the original bands from The Masque era, the Mau-Mau's are conspicuous by their absence from Decline.  Wilder's eccentric attitude toward the record industry and the legendarily self-destructive lifestyles of himself and his band members guaranteed that no record company would risk finances on the Mau-Mau's.  This lack of recorded music contributed towards a long period of obscurity despite being well known by most in the early Los Angeles punk rock scene. The Mau-Mau's can be seen briefly in the movie Rock 'n' Roll High School, have appeared in the movie Cocaine and Blue Eyes starring O. J. Simpson, and were included in the compilation Hell Comes to Your House II.

Rick Wilder also showed up in The Weeknd's music videos for the songs "Tell Your Friends", "The Hills", and "Can't Feel My Face". He is also the main character in Ariel Pink's music videos for the song "Dayzed Inn Daydreams".

The Mau-Mau's long-awaited album Scorched Earth Policies... Then and Now was released by Ratchet Blade Records in 2012.  It features The Doors' Robbie Krieger playing guitar on the Wilder-Campbell punk classic, "(I'm) Psychotic". The album was produced by L.A. punk pioneer Geza X Gideon.

Over the years and throughout the Mau-Mau's history, Rick Wilder lived between New York at his sister's apartment (opera singer Aprile Millo) and L.A., giving him the flexibility to work with other musicians and perform shows. There is an extensive list of members who have collaborated with Rick Wilder, not just under the Mau-Mau's name, but formed new projects around Rick Wilder.

References

External links
 Official website
 Rick Wilder on-air interview

Punk rock groups from California
Musical groups established in 1978
Musical groups from Los Angeles